Czech fire sport (Czech: Požární sport) is a distinctively Czech sport.
Every Czech municipality has to establish a volunteer fire department in accordance with Regulation § 29 law nr. 133/1985 Sb. Consequently, a special subculture of volunteer firefighters developed, and later competitions in firefighter's skills were created. The sport is widespread and popular, especially in the countryside.

History 

The tradition of Czech fire sport was begun in 1967, inspired by the Soviet fire-fighting sport. Although Soviet culture was not widely accepted among the Czech population, because the country had been occupied by the Red Army, the fire-fighting sport won popularity, and is practiced to this day. It has evolved, however, into a distinctly Czech form.

Events

100-meter obstacle course (100 m překážek) 

A race for individuals. Obstacles are specially designed to simulate firefighting reality.

National record: Professional Firefighters  Jakub Pěkný, 15,09 seconds

Men  Daniel Klvaňa, 14,81 seconds

Women  Šárka Jiroušová, 15,56 seconds

400-meter obstacle relay (4x100m překážek)

A race for a four-member team. Obstacles are specially designed to simulate firefighting reality.

National record: Professional firefighters HZS Moravskoslezského kraje -
David Dopirák, Tomáš Drobisz, Pavel Krpec Jakub Arvai, 53,36 seconds

Men SDH Mistřín - Vojtěch Marada, Petr Kyněra, Michal Vašulka, Petr Vašulka, 60,50 seconds

Women SDH Chválenice - Lucie Hirmerová, Barbora Šubrtová, Markéta Marková, Dominika Caltová, 61,13 seconds

Tower-climbing

A fire-sport tower and a ladder with hooks are needed. The goal is to reach the fourth floor by hooking the window frames of the tower. The most challenging event.

National record: Professional firefighters HZS Moravskoslezského kraje - Kamil Bezruč, 13,25 seconds

Fire attack (požární útok)

The most popular event, with the highest number of competing teams. Each team has seven members.

The event requires a pool (káď), water pump (stroj or mašina), hard suction hose (savice), fire hose splitter (rozdělovač or rozbočovač), smooth bore nozzle (proudnice), and two types of hoses. The first type is The B-Hose (hadice B), with a nominal inner diameter of 65 mm to 75 mm. The second is the C-Hose (hadice C), with a nominal inner diameter of 38 mm to 52 mm.

The goal is to hit a small target with the water stream. The target is connected by wire to a chronometer.

National record: Professional firefighters HZS Moravskoslezského kraje -
Libor Morozowski, Pavel Krpec, Kamil Bezruč, Ondřej Langer, Jakub Arvai, Pavel Maňas, Ondřej Kubala, 20,83 seconds

Men - no records

Women SDH Michálkovice - Ester Illichmannová, Nikol Purčová, Petra Mifkovičová, Klára Bezručová, Lucie Nechvátalová, Kateřina Uhrová, Barbora Janíková, 24,36 seconds

Categories 

Preschoolers (4 – 6 years)
Younger children (6 – 11 years)
Older children (11 – 15 years)
Youth boys (13 – 18 years)
Youth girls (13 – 18 years)
Adult men (18+ years)
Adult women (18+ years)
Seniors (35+ years)

Culture aspects 

Despite a wide popularity, Czech fire sport in general is not reflected in any artwork. Conventional media usually don't cover fire sport events except national race. However, participants of fire sport publish fanzines and even create reportages in a special TV broadcast via the Internet.

External links

References

Sport in the Czech Republic
Firefighting